Tudor Drăganu (December 2, 1912 – August 21, 2010) was a Romanian jurist who specialized in constitutional law.

Born in Năsăud, in what was then Austria-Hungary, his father was linguist Nicolae Drăganu. After completing primary school in his native town, he went to George Barițiu High School in Cluj, followed by the law faculty of the University of Cluj. There, he successively worked as assistant, associate and full professor of constitutional and administrative law. He was elected an honorary member of the Romanian Academy in 2003.

Notes

References
 Lucian Chiriac, "L'activité scientifique et les contributions du professeur Tudor Drăganu à l'évolution du droit public", in Revista "Curentul Juridic", 1(52)/2013, p. 13-16
 Ioanela Alis Seni, Ioan Seni, "140 de ani de la înființarea Academiei Române. Academicienii năsăudeni și spiritul cărturăresc năsăudean", in Revista Transilvania, 3/2006, p. 43-53

1912 births
2010 deaths
People from Năsăud
Babeș-Bolyai University alumni
Academic staff of Babeș-Bolyai University
Romanian jurists
Honorary members of the Romanian Academy